Saw Mo Shay (1967 – 22 July 2021) was a Karen insurgent officer and commander-in-chief of DKBA-5, an insurgent group active in Kayin State, Myanmar.

Biography
He was appointed commander-in-chief in an emergency meeting with DKBA-5 commanders, after the original commander-in-chief, Saw La Pwe, died from throat cancer in Bago. Saw Mo Shay was previously the deputy commander-in-chief of DKBA-5. 

Saw Mo Shay died of COVID-19 in Yangon.

References

1967 births
2021 deaths
Burmese people of Karen descent
Burmese military personnel
Burmese rebels
Deaths from the COVID-19 pandemic in Myanmar